Peter Loehr (March 7, 1831 – February 9, 1899) was a member of the Wisconsin State Assembly.

Biography
Loehr was born on March 7, 1831, in what is now Thalheim, Germany. He immigrated to the United States in 1855. After residing in Milwaukee, Wisconsin, he settled in Dotyville, Wisconsin, in 1858. He died on February 9, 1899, in Forest, Wisconsin. Reports have differed on the location.

Career
Loehr was elected to the Assembly in 1888. In addition, he was chairman (similar to mayor) of Forest. He was a Democrat.

References

External links
Geni.com

People from Erzgebirgskreis
Politicians from Milwaukee
People from Forest, Fond du Lac County, Wisconsin
Democratic Party members of the Wisconsin State Assembly
Mayors of places in Wisconsin
1831 births
1899 deaths
Burials in Wisconsin
19th-century American politicians